The Sierra Madre (Spanish for "mother range") is a mountain range primarily in northern Santa Barbara County and extending into northwestern Ventura County in Southern California, western United States.  It is a range of the Inner South Coast Ranges group, and is the southernmost reach of the California Coast Ranges, which are themselves part of the Pacific Coast Ranges of western North America.

Geography
Snow falls on the highest peaks during the winter months.

The range forms the southwestern side of the Cuyama Valley. The La Panza Range is a northern extension of the Sierra Madre, located in eastern San Luis Obispo County.

The Sierra Madre is almost entirely within the Los Padres National Forest, and marks the northern boundary of the San Rafael Wilderness area.

To the southeast, the range merges with the San Rafael Mountains of the Transverse Ranges System, in a complex topography of unnamed ranges. The adjacent highest point of the San Rafael Mountains, and in all Santa Barbara County, is Big Pine Mountain.

Natural history
The predominant vegetation type on the mountains is chaparral, with oak woodlands that occur in microclimates, both of the California interior chaparral and woodlands sub-ecoregion. The higher elevations support California mixed evergreen forest and small areas of coniferous forest habitats.

The mountains are one of the most important undeveloped habitat areas of the endangered California condor.

Geologically, the mountains are almost entirely composed of sedimentary rocks of Tertiary age.  Most of the rocks are Eocene marine sandstones and other sediments, and one region in the eastern portion of the range is made up of middle and early Miocene sediments.  The mountain range is delineated on the south by the Nacimiento Fault, and on the north, by the South Cuyama and Ozena Faults.  The Sierra Madre rises abruptly just south of the Cuyama Valley, which defines the northern boundary of Santa Barbara County.

The mountain range is almost entirely uninhabited, except for portions of the lower slopes to the north, which have been developed for oil and gas production at the South Cuyama Oil Field.  One difficult, single-lane dirt road follows the mountain crest; it often is closed after storms, and is normally only passable by four-wheel-drive vehicles or motorcycles.

See also
California chaparral and woodlands — ecoregion.
Flora of the California chaparral and woodlands

References

External links
Ventura County Biogeography

California Coast Ranges
Mountain ranges of Santa Barbara County, California
Mountain ranges of Ventura County, California
Cuyama Valley
Los Padres National Forest
Mountain ranges of Southern California